Hans Mariacher (11 August 1910 – 24 June 1985) was an Austrian ski jumper. He competed in the individual event at the 1936 Winter Olympics.

References

External links
 

1910 births
1985 deaths
Austrian male ski jumpers
Olympic ski jumpers of Austria
Ski jumpers at the 1936 Winter Olympics
People from Kitzbühel
Sportspeople from Tyrol (state)
20th-century Austrian people